In economics and related disciplines, a transaction cost is a cost in making any economic trade when participating in a market. The idea that transactions form the basis of economic thinking was introduced by the institutional economist John R. Commons in 1931, and Oliver E. Williamson's Transaction Cost Economics article, published in 2008, popularized the concept of transaction costs. Douglass C. North argues that institutions, understood as the set of rules in a society, are key in the determination of transaction costs. In this sense, institutions that facilitate low transaction costs, boost economic growth.

Definitions
Williamson defines transaction costs as the costs of running an economic system of companies, and unlike production costs, decision-makers determine strategies of companies by measuring transaction costs and production costs. Transaction costs are the total costs of making a transaction, including the cost of planning, deciding, changing plans, resolving disputes, and after-sales. Therefore, the transaction cost is one of the most significant factors in business operation and management.

Douglass North states that there are four factors that comprise transaction costs – "measurement", "enforcement", "ideological attitudes and perceptions", and "the size of the market". Measurement refers to the calculation of the value of all aspects of the good or service involved in the transaction. Enforcement can be defined as the need for an unbiased third party to ensure that neither party involved in the transaction reneges on their part of the deal. These first two factors appear in the concept of ideological attitudes and perceptions, North's third aspect of transaction costs. Ideological attitudes and perceptions encapsulate each individual's set of values, which influences their interpretation of the world. The final aspect of transaction costs, according to North, is market size, which affects the partiality or impartiality of transactions.

Transaction costs can be divided into three broad categories:
 Search and information costs are costs such as in determining that the required good is available on the market, which has the lowest price, etc.
Bargaining and decision costs are the costs required to come to an acceptable agreement with the other party to the transaction, drawing up an appropriate contract and so on. In game theory this is analyzed for instance in the game of chicken. On asset markets and in organizational economics, the transaction cost is some function of the distance between the supply and demand.
 Policing and enforcement costs are the costs of making sure the other party sticks to the terms of the contract, and taking appropriate action (often through the legal system) if this turns out not to be the case.

For example, the buyer of a used car faces a variety of different transaction costs. The search costs are the costs of finding a car and determining the car's condition. The bargaining costs are the costs of negotiating a price with the seller. The policing and enforcement costs are the costs of ensuring that the seller delivers the car in the promised condition.

History of development 

The idea that transactions form the basis of an economic thinking was introduced by the institutional economist John R. Commons (1931). He said that:

The term "transaction cost" is frequently thought to have been coined by Ronald Coase, who used it to develop a theoretical framework for predicting when certain economic tasks would be performed by firms, and when they would be performed on the market. However, the term is actually absent from his early work up to the 1970s. While he did not coin the specific term, Coase indeed discussed "costs of using the price mechanism" in his 1937 paper The Nature of the Firm, where he first discusses the concept of transaction costs. This is the first time that the concept of transaction costs has been introduced into the study of enterprises and market organizations, but "transaction cost" as a formal theory started in the late 1960s and early 1970s. And refers to the "Costs of Market Transactions" in his seminal work, The Problem of Social Cost (1960). The term "Transaction Costs" itself can instead be traced back to the monetary economics literature of the 1950s, and does not appear to have been consciously 'coined' by any particular individual.

Arguably, transaction cost reasoning became most widely known through Oliver E. Williamson's Transaction Cost Economics. Today, transaction cost economics is used to explain a number of different behaviours. Often this involves considering as "transactions" not only the obvious cases of buying and selling, but also day-to-day emotional interactions, informal gift exchanges, etc.  Oliver E. Williamson, one of the most cited social scientist at the turn of the century, was awarded the 2009 Nobel Memorial Prize in Economics.

According to Williamson, the determinants of transaction costs are frequency, specificity, uncertainty, limited rationality, and opportunistic behavior.

At least two definitions of the phrase "transaction cost" are commonly used in literature.  Transaction costs have been broadly defined by Steven N. S. Cheung as any costs that are not conceivable in a "Robinson Crusoe economy"—in other words, any costs that arise due to the existence of institutions.  For Cheung, if the term "transaction costs" were not already so popular in economics literatures, they should more properly be called "institutional costs".  But many economists seem to restrict the definition to exclude costs internal to an organization.  The latter definition parallels Coase's early analysis of "costs of the price mechanism" and the origins of the term as a market trading fee.

Starting with the broad definition, many economists then ask what kind of institutions (firms, markets, franchises, etc.) minimize the transaction costs of producing and distributing a particular good or service. Often these relationships are categorized by the kind of contract involved.  This approach sometimes goes under the rubric of new institutional economics.

Technologies associated with the Fourth Industrial Revolution such as, in particular, distributed ledger technology and blockchains are likely to reduce transaction costs comparatively to traditional forms of contracting.

Examples 
A supplier may bid in a very competitive environment with a customer to build a widget.  However, to make the widget, the supplier will be required to build specialized machinery which cannot be easily redeployed to make other products.  Once the contract is awarded to the supplier, the relationship between customer and supplier changes from a competitive environment to a monopoly/monopsony relationship, known as a bilateral monopoly.  This means that the customer has greater leverage over the supplier such as when price cuts occur.  To avoid these potential costs, "hostages" may be swapped to avoid this event.  These hostages could include partial ownership in the widget factory; revenue sharing might be another way.

Car companies and their suppliers often fit into this category, with the car companies forcing price cuts on their suppliers.  Defense suppliers and the military appear to have the opposite problem, with cost overruns occurring quite often. Technologies like enterprise resource planning (ERP) can provide technical support for these strategies.

An example of measurement, one of North's four factors of transaction costs, is detailed in Mancur Olson's work Dictatorship, Democracy, and Development (1993) – Olson writes that roving bandits calculate the success of their banditry based on how much money they can take from their citizens. Enforcement, the second of North's factors of transaction costs, is exemplified in Diego Gambetta's book The Sicilian Mafia: the Business of Private Protection (1996). Gambetta describes the concept of the "Peppe", who occupies the role of mediator in dealings with the Sicilian mafia – the Peppe is needed because it is not certain that both parties will maintain their end of the deal. Measurement and enforcement comprise North's third factor, ideological attitudes and perceptions – each individual's views influence how they go about each transaction.

Differences from neoclassical microeconomics 

Williamson argues in The Mechanisms of Governance (1996) that Transaction Cost Economics (TCE) differs from neoclassical microeconomics in the following points:

The transaction costs frameworks reject the notion of instrumental rationality and its implications for predicting behavior. Whereas instrumental rationality assumes that an actor's understanding of the world is the same as the objective reality of the world, scholars who focus on transaction costs note that actors lack perfect information about the world (due to bounded rationality).

Game theory 
In game theory, transaction costs have been studied by Anderlini and Felli (2006). They consider a model with two parties who together can generate a surplus. Both parties are needed to create the surplus. Yet, before the parties can negotiate about dividing the surplus, each party must incur transaction costs. Anderlini and Felli find that transaction costs cause a severe problem when there is a mismatch between the parties’ bargaining powers and the magnitude of the transaction costs. In particular, if a party has large transaction costs but in future negotiations it can seize only a small fraction of the surplus (i.e., its bargaining power is small), then this party will not incur the transaction costs and hence the total surplus will be lost. It has been shown that the presence of transaction costs as modelled by Anderlini and Felli can overturn central insights of the Grossman-Hart-Moore theory of the firm.

Evaluative mechanisms 
Oliver E. Williamson (1979) stated that evaluative mechanisms consist of four variables, namely, frequency of exchange, asset specificity, uncertainty, and threat of opportunism.

 Frequency of exchange refers to buyer activity in the market or the frequency of transactions between the parties occurs. The higher the frequency of transactions, the higher the relative administrative and bargaining costs.
 Asset specificity consist of site, physical asset, and human asset specificity. The asset specific investment is a specialized investment, which does not have market liquidity. Once the contract is terminated, the asset specific investment cannot to be redeployed. Therefore, a change or termination of this transaction will result in significant loss.
 Uncertainty refers to the risks that may occur in a market exchange. The increase of environmental uncertainty will be accompanied by the increase of transaction cost, such as information acquisition cost, supervision cost and bargaining cost.
 Threat of opportunism is attributed to human nature. Opportunistic behavior of vendors can lead to higher transaction coordination costs or even termination of contracts. A company can use governance mechanism to reducing the threat of opportunism.

The merit of Coase and Cheung, contrary to Williamson, has been to emphasize these various obstacles to the ideal use of the price system.

“The main reason that makes it profitable to start a business could be that it is expensive to use the price mechanism. The most obvious cost of "organizing" production through the price mechanism is the discovery of relevant prices. This cost can be reduced, but not eliminated, by the emergence of specialized actors who sell this information." (The nature of the firm, p. 390)

Note 4 is also quoted by Steven Cheung: "(…) the assumption that all individuals know all relevant prices is clearly not true in the real world." (p. 390, in The contractual nature of the firm, 1983). In Coase's article, the problem of uncertainty (Knight) is dominated by that of finding natural or essential prices (Adam Smith). The hypothetical situation in which all prices are 'essential' ("relevant prices") and therefore transaction costs are negligible, is a situation of independent producers and buyers, who have a good knowledge of the value and therefore product costs. It is the one that is described by Cheung from a situation, borrowed from Smith, in which all exchanges are strictly commercial: "Consider the classic example of the 'pin factory', in which each owner of the set of resources specializes in working on a single task. If all transaction costs were zero, the purchaser of a pin would make a separate payment to each of the many participants in its production." (The contractual nature of the firm, p. 4).

A transaction cost is the difference between the fictitious price of an infinitesimal productive service, the "essential price" (the effective price of which could be represented by a tip) and the effective price of a commodity. The more technical it is, the higher the transaction cost will be. A regime of low transaction costs is therefore low tech (cf. P. Bihouix), which does not imply a low level of wealth (low life): "If there were no measurement costs and performance evaluation, there would be no firms and the value of the social outputs would be maximum." (Cheung, 1983). The difference between the two prices is the 'social cost' of the organization of production or the 'added value' by it (in the sense of "mehrwert"), which are approximation values ('proxy values') : "all organization costs are transaction costs, and vice versa", S.N.S. Cheung, ‘Economic organization and transaction costs’, The New Palgrave, 1987, p. 56. Attachment, often pathological, to cooperation, to organizations, to exclusive property, to commodities and possibly to comfort... are the basic transaction costs (cf. 'fetishism').

See also 

 Diseconomy of scale
 Economic anthropology
 Ronald Coase
 Herbert A. Simon
 Oliver E. Williamson
 Opportunity Cost
 Interaction cost
 Market impact
 Property rights (economics)
 Switching costs
 Theory of the firm
 The Nature of the Firm
 Transaction cost accounting
 Vertical integration

Notes

References 
North, Douglass C. 1992. “Transaction costs, institutions, and economic performance.” San Francisco, CA: ICS Press.

Coggan, Anthea; van Grieken, Martijn; Jardi, Xavier; Boullier, Alexis (2017). "Does asset specificity influence transaction costs and adoption? An analysis of sugarcane farmers in the Great Barrier Reef catchments". Journal of Environmental Economics and Policy. 6 (1): 36–50. doi:10.1080/21606544.2016.1175975. ISSN 2160-6544.
 
 
Ketokivi, Mikko; Mahoney, Joseph T. (2017-10-26). "Transaction Cost Economics as a Theory of the Firm, Management, and Governance". Oxford Research Encyclopedia of Business and Management. doi:10.1093/acrefore/9780190224851.013.6. Retrieved 2020-11-01.
 Klaes, M. (2008). "transaction costs, history of," The New Palgrave Dictionary of Economics, 2nd Edition. Abstract.
 Niehans, Jürg (1987). “Transaction costs," The New Palgrave: A Dictionary of Economics, v. 4, pp. 677–80.
 Pierre Schlag, The Problem of Transaction Costs, 62 Southern California Law Review 1661 (1989).

 Williamson, Oliver E. (1981). "The Economics of Organization: The Transaction Cost Approach," The American Journal of Sociology, 87(3), pp. 548-577.
 _ (1985). The Economic Institutions of Capitalism: Firms, Markets, Relational Contracting. Preview to p. 25.  New York, NY: Free Press.
 _ (1996). The Mechanisms of Governance. Preview. Oxford University Press.
 _ (2002). "The Theory of the Firm as Governance Structure: From Choice to Contract," Journal of Economic Perspectives, 16(3), pp. 171-195.
 Milgrom, P., and J. Roberts, "Bargaining Costs, Influence Costs, and the Organization of Economic Activity," in J.E. Alt and K.A. Shepsle (eds.), Perspectives on Positive Political Economy, Cambridge: University of Cambridge, 1990, 57-89.

Young, Suzanne (2013). "Transaction Cost Economics". Springer Link. doi:10.1007/978-3-642-28036-8_221. Retrieved 2020-11-01.

Costs
Production economics
New institutional economics